La Academia 5 is the fifth musical reality show in the La Academia franchise. The auditions were done nationwide and a total of 30 people were chosen to go to Mexico where they would have to spend a week working hard and showing all of what they had inside to be chosen to the final 20, a first for La academia for the past 5 seasons including La academia USA only 18 finalists were selected. The first La academia 5 concert was on July 9, 2006.

A week before the first concert, there was a special show that lasted two hours. In that show, footage from the auditions was shown. At the end, 10 of the 30 were eliminated leaving the lucky 20 that Azteca America had chosen to become the fifth generation of La academia. This season also marked the introduction of the lights on the judges' lecterns. Judges press a button on their podium, which turns the lights on the front of the lectern red, when the judge believes a contestant is performing poorly. If all three judges' lights are red, the contestant is not permitted to complete their song and the judges critique them on whatever was performed up to that point.

After five months and 24 concerts of competition La academia 5 came to an end, crowning Samuel Castelán Marini as winner of the Latin Reality Show. As the winner and runner-up, Samuel Castelán Marini and Rocio Colette Acuña Calzada respectively received contracts with a Record Company to release an album. Second and third runners-up Marbella and Renata both released an album post-la academia.

Expulsion Order

This table shows info on every concert. It shows who was eliminated, who quit, and who entered or re-entered the competition. There were some concerts done outside La academia where the worst alumno(a) or contestant of the week would be put into a duel against a new person who didn't make it into the final 20 or an already expelled friend who wishes to return. If the stranger or expelled student perform better than the then current contestant they will get an opportunity to sing in the next official concert. If the new or expelled contestant won the duel they would share a song with the contestant they defeated in the duel. If the stranger or expelled contestant defeats the current contestant they will officially enter the competition. There were only two wins for the expelled contestant or stranger. Julio defeated Sebastian and Ivan, a brand new contestant, defeated Noe. However two ex-contestants returned without having to go through what Ivan and Julio did. Sebastian returned in the 10th concert due to a teacher's decision despite the judge's opinion. Marbella returned in the 13th concert due to the judge's decision in agreement with the teachers.

Contestants are in order from average ratings given by the judges.

Expulsion Order

 Winner
 Runner Up
 Finalist
 Voted Off
 Bottom 3
 Returnt
 Quit
 Didn't Participe

References

Season 5
2006 Mexican television seasons